George Thomas Stovall (November 23, 1877 – November 5, 1951), nicknamed "Firebrand", was an American first baseman in Major League Baseball. He played for the Cleveland Naps and the St. Louis Browns in the American League, and he also played two seasons with the Kansas City Packers of the short-lived Federal League. In , he jumped to the Packers as a first baseman-manager. In 1916, he signed with the Toledo Mud Hens and played a season there before retiring from baseball at age 39.

In 5596 career at bats, Stovall had 1382 hits. He recorded 231 doubles and 142 career stolen bases. While for the most part a first baseman, he did play some second base and even third base, especially early in his career. In 1905, he played 46 of his 112 games at second. Every year from 1905 until 1910, Stovall recorded at least 13 stolen bases.

In late 1913, Stovall was suspended by the American League for spitting tobacco juice at an umpire. However, league president Ban Johnson did not think this went far enough, and ordered Stovall fired. He was succeeded by the relatively little-known (at the time) Branch Rickey.

His elder brother, Jesse Stovall, pitched two seasons in the major leagues.

Managerial record

See also
 List of Major League Baseball player–managers

References

External links

 The Deadball Era
 

1877 births
1951 deaths
Major League Baseball first basemen
Cleveland Naps players
St. Louis Browns players
Cleveland Naps managers
St. Louis Browns managers
Minor league baseball managers
Portland Webfoots players
Burlington River Rats players
Kansas City Packers players
Toledo Iron Men players
Vernon Tigers players
Jacksonville Indians players
Baseball players from Missouri
Major League Baseball player-managers
People from Jackson County, Missouri
Baseball coaches from Missouri